Dr. John Billingham, BM BCh, (March 18, 1930 – August 4, 2013) was a British Physician and later director of the SETI Program Office and Director of the Life Sciences Division at the NASA Ames Research Center in the USA. After retiring from NASA he became a Trustee of the SETI Institute Board of Directors.

He was born in Worcester, England in 1930 and educated at the Royal Grammar School Worcester. From there he went on to University College, Oxford to study physiology. He gained a BM BCh degree from Oxford and Guy's Hospital, London (which is equivalent to an M.D. in the US).  He served as a medical officer with the Royal Air Force (RAF) for seven years, rising to the rank of Squadron Leader (equivalent to Major in the USAF). In 1963, he was invited to join NASA’s Lyndon B. Johnson Space Center in Houston, Texas, where he headed the Environmental Physiology Branch, and worked on the Mercury, Gemini and Apollo programs.

In 1965 he moved to the NASA Ames Research Center in California, where he headed up the Biotechnology Division, then the Extraterrestrial Research Division, and later the Life Science Division. In 1977 he appeared in the television documentary Mysteries of the Gods hosted by William Shatner to outline the projected search for extraterrestrial life that would later become Project Cyclops.

In 2009 he was inducted into the NASA Ames Hall of Fame where he was recognized for his efforts as the Father of SETI in NASA.  After retiring from NASA he joined the SETI Institute as Senior Scientist, and in 1995 he became a Member of the SETI Institute's Board of Trustees, serving a term as Vice-Chair. He was also one of the people behind Project Cyclops.

He died at the age of 83 in Grass Valley, California in August 2013.

References

External links
Search for Extraterrestrial Intelligence (SETI)",1993, NASA Technical Reports Server
A reply from earth - A proposed approach to developing a message from humankind to extraterrestrial intelligence after we detect them",1990, NASA Technical Reports Server
The Evolution of Complex Life", 1989, NASA Technical Reports Server
Cultural aspects of SETI", 1991, NASA Technical Reports Server
Detection of the earth with the SETI microwave observing system assumed to be operating out in the Galaxy", 1991, NASA Technical Reports
An overview of selected biomedical aspects of Mars missions ", 1989, NASA Technical Reports Server

 'Father of SETI' at NASA, John Billingham astrobio.net
 Remembering John Billingham centauri-dreams.org, Retrieved 2013-08-09.

1930 births
2013 deaths
Military personnel from Worcester, England
Royal Air Force officers
Search for extraterrestrial intelligence
People educated at the Royal Grammar School Worcester
NASA people
English emigrants to the United States
Physicians from California
Alumni of University College, Oxford
Medical doctors from Worcester, England
20th-century English medical doctors
21st-century English medical doctors